(OFw or OF) is the fourth highest non-commissioned officer (NCO) rank in German Army and German Air Force.

History 

The rank was introduced first by the German Reichswehr in 1920. Preferable most experienced Protégée-NCO of the old army have been promoted.

Within the Reichswehr,  was taken over as second-highest Protégée-NCO rank by the German Wehrmacht in 1935. In the military branch cavalry, artillery and anti-aircraft artillery it was called Oberwachtmeister.

The equivalent rank to the Oberfeldwebel in the Waffen-SS was the SS-Hauptscharführer from 1938 until 1945.

The rank has been used in the GDR National People's Army from 1956 until 1990 as well.

Rank information
It is grouped as OR6 in NATO, equivalent in the US Army to Staff Sergeant, or in British Army / RAF to Sergeant.

In army/ air force context NCOs of this rank were formally addressed as Herr Oberfeldwebel also informally / short Oberfeld.

The sequence of ranks (top-down approach) in that particular group ([[Unteroffiziere mit Portepee|Senior NCOs with portepee]]) is as follows:
OR-9:  / 
OR-8:  / 
OR-7:  / 
OR-6:  / 
OR-6:  / 

Remark
The abbreviation "OR" stands for "Other Ranks / fr: sous-officiers et militaires du rang / ru:другие ранги, кроме офицероф"!

References

Sources 
 
 

Military ranks of Germany